Caesar Creek is a stream in Clinton, Greene, and Warren counties, Ohio, in the United States.

Caesar Creek was named for a surveyor's black slave who died and was buried along the creek's banks.

Caesar Creek is dammed in Caesar Creek State Park to form Caesar Creek Lake.

References

Location
Mouth: Confluence with the Little Miami River at 
Source: Greene County, Ohio at

See also
List of rivers of Ohio

Rivers of Clinton County, Ohio
Rivers of Greene County, Ohio
Rivers of Warren County, Ohio
Rivers of Ohio